Thomas Goiginger (born 15 March 1993) is an Austrian professional footballer who plays as a midfielder for Austrian Bundesliga club LASK and the Austria national team.

Club career
Goiginger has played for Union Vöcklamarkt, TSV Neumarkt, SV Grödig, FC Blau-Weiß Linz, and LASK Linz.

International career
In November 2018, Goiginger was called up to the Austria squad for the first team and was unused substitute during their UEFA Nations League matches against Bosnia and Herzegovina and Northern Ireland.

He made his debut on 19 November 2019 in a Euro 2020 qualifier against Latvia. He started the game and played the first 69 minutes.

Career statistics

References

1993 births
Living people
Association football midfielders
Austrian footballers
Austria international footballers
TSV Neumarkt players
SV Grödig players
LASK players
Austrian Football Bundesliga players
2. Liga (Austria) players